Marco Casanova (born 7 June 1976 in Chur) is a Swiss former alpine skier who competed in the 1998 Winter Olympics.

External links
 sports-reference.com
 

1976 births
Living people
Swiss male alpine skiers
Olympic alpine skiers of Switzerland
Alpine skiers at the 1998 Winter Olympics
People from Chur
Sportspeople from Graubünden